Back from Hell is a 1992 horror film based on the Faust legend. It is the directorial debut of Matt Jaissle.

Plot
A priest visits his old friend, who has gone to Hollywood to become an actor and finds out that the friend has sold his soul to Satan for fortune and fame. The priest decides to try to help his friend regain his soul.

Reception
Steve Miller felt that the films premise of an actor who inspires homicidal rage in anyone who sees his eyes was interesting but that the execution overall was poor. Edmond Grant of The Motion Picture Guide described the film as an "adolescent approach to horror" and criticised Jaissle for his use of gore and blood as opposed to well crafted tension and scares as well as his usage of profanity instead of original dialogue. He also stated that the film was unintentionally humours for the first half hour. Joseph Ziemba of Birth.Movies.Death described the film as if Lucio Fulci's teenage cousin remade The Evil Dead for the price of an Orange Julius in rural Michigan.

References

External links
 

1992 horror films
1992 films
Works based on the Faust legend
American supernatural horror films
Films shot in Michigan
1990s English-language films
1990s American films